Beyond the Gates may refer to:

In music:
 Beyond the Gates (Possessed album), 1986
 Beyond the Gates (Joacim Cans album), 2004
 Beyond the Gates festival, an annual extreme metal festival that takes place every year the last wek-end of August in Bergen, Norway

In film:
 The Walls of Malapaga (alternate English title: Beyond the Gates), a 1949 Franco-Italian film
 Shooting Dogs (U.S. title: Beyond the Gates), a 2005 film about the 1994 Rwandan Genocide
 Beyond the Gates (2016 film), a 2016 American horror film

Other:
 Beyond the Gates, also Beyond the Gates of Splendor, a 2002 documentary about Operation Auca

See also
 Beyond the Gates of Dream, a collection of short stories by Lin Carter